Night Walks is the third studio album from British singer songwriter Sarah Nixey. The album was written whilst Nixey was struggling with insomnia after the birth of her youngest child.

Track listing

Personnel
Sarah Nixey - vocals, instruments
Jimmy Hogarth - instruments
Martin Slattery - drums on "Coming Up for Air"
Ava Nixey-Moore - flute on "The Planet of Dreams"

References

2018 albums
Sarah Nixey albums